The Shanghai Oriental Sports Center (Simplified Chinese: 上海东方体育中心), also known as the Shanghai Aquatic Sports Center, is a sports venue that started construction on December 30, 2008, and was completed in late 2010.

The center has an indoor arena named Indoor Stadium seating 18,000, an indoor swimming pool seating 5,000, and an outdoor swimming pool also seating 5,000. The Shanghai Oriental Sports Center is close to Huangpu River, next to Expo Park in Shanghai's Pudong New Area. The total investment was two billion yuan. The center is situated near the Oriental Sports Center station on the Shanghai Metro.

Indoor stadium
The main venue at the sports complex is the Indoor Stadium, used for the home games of the arena football club Shanghai Skywalkers. It has a capacity of 18,000 and it is used for various events, like arena football, speed skating, basketball, mixed martial arts, figure skating, swimming and eSports.

Notable events 
 14th World Aquatics Championships from July 16–31, 2011
 2012 World Short Track Speed Skating Championships
 2014 FINA Diving World Cup
 2015 World Figure Skating Championships 23–29 March 2015
 Road FC 27
 2016 League of Legends Mid-Season Invitational
2017 League of Legends World Championship Semifinals

Structure
The arena was designed by German architecture firm GMP. The facility sits on a man-made lake that connects to the Huangpu River. In the construction, the workers used 3,000 tons steel to build the architecture.

References

External links

 Shanghai 2011: Shanghai Oriental Sports Center

Swimming venues in China
Indoor arenas in China
Water polo venues
Sports venues in Shanghai
Gerkan, Marg and Partners buildings
Sports venues completed in 2011
Esports venues in China